Hearts in Exile is a 1929 American pre-Code romance film produced and distributed by Warner Bros. and directed by Michael Curtiz. It was also released in a silent version with music and effects. It starred Dolores Costello in a story based on the 1904 novel by John Oxenham. An earlier 1915 film starring Clara Kimball Young was also produced, and is extant, but the 1929 version is considered to be a lost film.

Cast
 Dolores Costello as Vera Zuanova
 Grant Withers as Paul Pavloff
 James Kirkwood, Sr. as Baron Serge Palma
 George Fawcett as Dmitri Ivanov
 David Torrence as Governor
 Olive Tell as Anna Reskova
 Lee Moran as Professor Rooster
 Tom Dugan as Orderly
 Rose Dione as Marya
 William Irving as Rat Catcher
 Carrie Daumery as Baroness Veimar

Box office
According to Warner Bros the film earned $424,000 domestically and $229,000 foreign.

See also
List of lost films
List of early Warner Bros. sound and talking features

References

External links
 

Hearts in Exile at silentera.com 
 foreign release poster of Hearts in Exile(Wayback Machine)
News advert for the movie

1929 films
Films directed by Michael Curtiz
1920s English-language films
1929 romance films
American black-and-white films
Warner Bros. films
Transitional sound films
Lost American films
American romance films
1929 lost films
Lost romance films
1920s American films
Films based on British novels